Farmington High School may refer to:

 Farmington High School (Arkansas), Farmington, Arkansas
 Farmington High School (Connecticut), Farmington, Connecticut
 Farmington Central High School (Illinois), Farmington, Illinois
 Farmington High School (Kentucky), Farmington, Kentucky
 Farmington Central High School (Michigan), Farmington, Michigan
 Farmington High School (Michigan), Farmington, Michigan
 Farmington Senior High School (Minnesota), Farmington, Minnesota
 Farmington Senior High School (Missouri), Farmington, Missouri
 Farmington High School (New Mexico), Farmington, New Mexico
 Farmington Senior High School (New Hampshire), Farmington, New Hampshire
 Farmington High School (Utah), Farmington, Utah
 Farmington High School (West Virginia), Farmington, West Virginia
 North Farmington High School, Farmington Hills, Michigan